Sir John Martin Lavan (September 1911 – 1 December 2006) was a judge in the Supreme Court of Western Australia.

He was educated at CBC Perth (now Trinity College) and Xavier College. He joined Lavan and Walsh in 1934, where he remained until 1969.

He was appointed to the bench of the Supreme Court of Western Australia in 1969, a position he held until 1981.

He served as president of the law society from 1964 to 1966, and he was also chairman of the Parole Board of WA from 1960 to 1969.

References

1911 births
2006 deaths
Australian Knights Bachelor
Judges of the Supreme Court of Western Australia
People educated at Aquinas College, Perth